József Pálinkás (January 1, 1912 - April 24, 1991) was a Hungarian football forward who played for Hungary in the 1938 FIFA World Cup. He also played for Szeged FC.

References

External links

Hungarian footballers
Hungary international footballers
Association football goalkeepers
1938 FIFA World Cup players
1912 births
Year of death missing